Elm Township may refer to the following places in the United States:

 Elm Township, Allen County, Kansas
 Elm Township, Antelope County, Nebraska
 Elm Township, Gage County, Nebraska

See also
 Elm Creek Township, Buffalo County, Nebraska

Township name disambiguation pages